Stadius is a ghostly remnant of an ancient lunar impact crater that has been nearly obliterated by basaltic lava flows. It was named after Flemish astronomer Johannes Stadius. It lies to the southwest of the much younger crater Eratosthenes, at the north edge of Mare Insularum where the mare joins Sinus Aestuum. To the west is the prominent ray crater Copernicus, and multiple secondary craters from the Copernican ejecta cover this area. To the northwest is a chain of craters that continue in a roughly linear formation until reaching Mare Imbrium.

Only the northwestern rim of Stadius remains nearly intact, and it joins with a north-running ridge line that reaches the western rampart of Eratosthenes. The remainder of the formation forms a ghostly trace of the original rim, created from a few rises in the surface, and there is no indication of a central peak. The flat crater floor is pock-marked by craterlets, many of which were generated by secondary impacts from the creation of Copernicus.

Satellite craters

By convention these features are identified on lunar maps by placing the letter on the side of the crater midpoint that is closest to Stadius.

Popular Culture
Within the Sega CD RPG Lunar: The Silver Star (and all subsequent remakes) there is a region called the Stadius Zone, which is named after the Stadius crater.

References

External links

Stadius at The Moon Wiki
  - featuring three released photos from Luna 19 from 1971 - it includes Stadius in the third one
 
 

Impact craters on the Moon